Bear Skull Creek is a stream in the U.S. state of California. It is located in Siskiyou County.

References

Rivers of Northern California
Rivers of Siskiyou County, California